The West Indies Guard Ship (WIGS) is a ship of the Royal Netherlands Navy that rotates about every four to six months in support of the Dutch Caribbean Coast Guard. It can be a frigate but more commonly one of the navy's s is deployed to the region. This vessel usually carries an NHIndustries NH90 helicopter for search and rescue tasks and pursuit of suspect vessels.

A special boarding team from the U.S. Coast Guard can be embarked on board the WIGS, authorized to carry out boardings beyond the territorial waters of the Dutch Caribbean islands. This cooperation between Aruba, Curaçao, the Netherlands, Sint Maarten, the United States, and other actors is formalized in the Joint Interagency Task Force South, situated in Key West, Florida, United States.

Stationed ships

See also 
 West Indies Guard Ship, Royal Navy equivalent.

References

Patrol vessels of the Royal Netherlands Navy